The Museum of Modern Art (Museo de Arte Moderno or M.A.M.) was the Spanish national museum dedicated to 19th- and 20th-century painting. It was set up in 1894. It closed in 1971, when its 19th-century collections were merged into those of the Museo del Prado, but housed at the Casón del Buen Retiro, and its 20th-century collections formed into the Spanish Museum of Contemporary Art (Museo Español de Arte Contemporáneo or MEAC), the predecessor of the present-day Museo Nacional Centro de Arte Reina Sofía.

References 

Modern art museums in Spain
1894 establishments in Spain
1971 disestablishments in Spain
Defunct art museums and galleries
Art museums established in 1894
Art museums disestablished in 1971